Christian Social Party may refer to:

Christian Social Party (Austria)
Christian Social Party (Belgium)
Christian Social Party (Belgium, defunct)
Christian Social Party (Chile)
Christian Social Party (Germany)
Christian Social Union of Bavaria
Christian Socialist Party (Hungary)
Christian Social Party (Liechtenstein)
Christian Social Party (Netherlands)
Christian Social Party of Obwalden
Christian Social Party (Switzerland)
Christian Social Party (Venezuela)

See also
 Social Christian Party (disambiguation)